The Ministry of the Interior and Kingdom Relations (BZK) is the Netherlands' ministry responsible for domestic policy, civil service, public administration, elections, local governments, intelligence, and kingdom relations.

The minister of the interior and kingdom relations is a member of the Cabinet of the Netherlands. The ministry was created in 1798 as the Department of Internal Police, to monitor the state of dikes, roads, and waters of the Batavian Republic. It became the Ministry of the Interior in 1876 and had several name changes before adopting its current name in 1998.

Hanke Bruins Slot has been its incumbent minister since January 2022.

History
A precursor of the ministry, the Department for Internal Policy and Supervision on the State of Water Works, was founded in the Batavian Republic in 1798. This department was renamed Ministry of the Interior in 1801, and this name carried through when the Netherlands regained its independence in 1813. Its initial scope included such diverse policy areas as education, commerce, public health and telegraphy.

As the role of the government expanded with the advent of the welfare state in the late 19th and early 20th century, several of these policy areas were transferred to other ministries or given their own ministry. This started in 1877, when the Ministry of Water Management, Commerce and Industry was established. This development continued in the 20th century. In 1918, public housing was transferred to the Ministry of Labour, and a Ministry of Education, Arts and Science was established. The ministry was briefly renamed Ministry of the Interior and Agriculture in 1923, but agriculture was transferred to the Ministry of Economic Affairs in 1932.

More recently, the ministry has gained certain competences. In 1998, the responsibilities previously falling under the Cabinet for Netherlands Antillean and Aruban Affairs, a remnant of the Ministry of Colonial Affairs, were given to the ministry, which was renamed Ministry of the Interior and Kingdom Relations, referring to the relations between the different constituent countries within the Kingdom of the Netherlands. In 2010, security policy, including police and fire services, were transferred to the newly created Ministry of Security and Justice, while the Ministry of the Interior and Kingdom Relations regained public housing in return.

Responsibilities
The ministry is called the "Mother of all Ministries" because most ministries, like the former Ministry of Agriculture, Nature and Food Quality and Ministry of Education, Culture and Science split from the ministry at one time or another. It is also called the "residual ministry", because it is left with a diverse set of responsibilities after these splits. The ministry concerns itself with the following issues:
 Democracy and the rule of law
 Public administration
 The quality of personnel and management within central government
 The Dutch constitution and the system of constitutional government
 The partnership with Curaçao, Sint Maarten and Aruba
 Public housing and government buildings

Because it shares so many responsibilities, and has twin buildings (both old and new) with the Ministry of Justice and Security, they are sometimes called the twin ministries.

Organisation
The Ministry has currently three Government Agencies and two Directorates:

 Directorate for Public Administration (DGOO)
 Directorate for Management and Personnel Policy (BW)
 Directorate for Constitutional Affairs and Kingdom Relations (CKR)

See also
 List of Ministers of the Interior of the Netherlands
 List of Ministers of Kingdom Relations of the Netherlands

References

External links 
 

1798 establishments in the Batavian Republic
Interior and Kingdom Relations
Netherlands
Netherlands
Netherlands
Netherlands
Netherlands
Local government in the Netherlands
Ministries established in 1798
Skyscrapers in The Hague
18th-century architecture in the Netherlands